Traian Ungureanu (born 1 March 1958) is a former Romanian journalist and politician.

He has been a journalist at BBC World and was between 2009 and 2019 a Member of the European Parliament. He has spoken out about the persecution of Christians in the Middle East and the increasing number of mosques in Europe, and participated in the international counter-jihad conference in Brussels in 2007. He has written his own blog, and at Radio Europa Libera.

References

1958 births
Living people
Counter-jihad activists
Academic staff of the University of Bucharest
Democratic Liberal Party (Romania) MEPs
National Liberal Party (Romania) MEPs
MEPs for Romania 2009–2014
MEPs for Romania 2014–2019
Romanian bloggers
People from Bucharest